The bandeirantes were slavers, explorers, adventurers, and fortune hunters in early Colonial Brazil. They are largely responsible for Brazil's great expansion westward, far beyond the Tordesillas Line of 1494, by which Pope Alexander VI divided the new continent into a western, Castilian section, and an eastern, Portuguese section.

They mostly hailed from the São Paulo region, called the Captaincy of São Vicente until 1709 and then as the Captaincy of São Paulo. The São Paulo settlement served as the home base for the most famous bandeirantes. Some bandeirante leaders were descendants of first- and second-generation Portuguese who settled in São Paulo, but the bulk of their numbers was made of people of mameluco background (people of both European and Indian ancestries) and natives. Miscegenation was the norm in that society, and its initial family structure was polygamous (the father, his indigenous wives, and their children).

Though they originally aimed to capture and enslave Indigenous peoples, the bandeirantes later began to focus their expeditions on finding gold, silver, and diamond mines. As they ventured into unmapped regions in search of profit and adventure, they expanded the effective borders of the Brazilian colony.

The "bandeirantes" spoke the Língua Geral, based on Tupi, and were the main source of toponyms in the Brazilian interior.

Name
The term comes from Portuguese bandeira or flag, and by extension, a group of soldiers, a detached military unit or a raiding party. In medieval Portugal a bandeira was a military unit of 36 soldiers. The words were not used by the bandeirantes themselves. They used words like entry (entrada), journey, voyage, company, discovery and rarely, fleet or war. One writer dates bandeira from 1635 and bandeirante from 1740.

Paulistas

Before there were bandeirantes there were Paulistas. Brazil was originally a coastal strip between mountains and sea dominated by slave-worked sugar plantations. When the Portuguese crossed the mountains to the São Paulo plateau they were cut off from the sea and faced a great wilderness to the north and west where they might find their fortunes or die trying. The coastal Portuguese used African slaves while the Paulistas used Indian slaves or workers and many were part-Indian themselves.

Beginning of Bandeirantes 
With the treaty of Tordesillas in 1494 the South American continent was divided between  Portuguese Empire and the Spanish Empire along a meridian 370 leagues west of the Cape Verde islands. Many Bandeirantes were Mulattos and came from the Portuguese settlement in São Paulo who were sent out to chart and explore the interior of the country. By exploring the interior of the country, Portugal was able to claim land that exceeded the line drawn by the treaty of Tordesillas in 1494 and began to encompass what is today the country of Brazil. Bandeirantes usually numbered anywhere from 50 to several thousand and were sponsored by the wealthy elites. Many of these expeditions into the interior of Brazil set up trading posts and built roads that connected the settlements together.

Slavery
The main focus of the bandeirantes''' missions was to capture and enslave native populations. They carried this out by a number of tactics.  The bandeirantes usually relied on surprise attacks, simply raiding villages or collections of natives, killing any who resisted, and kidnapping the survivors.  Trickery could also be used; one common tactic was disguising themselves as Jesuits, often singing Mass to lure the natives out of their settlements.  At the time, the Jesuits had a deserved reputation as the only colonial force that treated the natives somewhat fairly in the Jesuit reductions of the region.  If luring the natives with promises did not work, the bandeirantes would surround the settlements and set them alight, forcing inhabitants out into the open. At a time when imported African slaves were comparatively expensive,  the bandeirantes were able to sell large numbers of native slaves at a huge profit due to their relatively inexpensive price. Bandeirantes also teamed up with a local tribe, convincing them that they were on their side against another tribe, and when both sides were weakened the Bandeirantes would capture both tribes and sell them into slavery.

By the 17th century, Jesuit missions had become a favorite target of the expeditions. A bandeira that took place in 1628 and was organized by Antônio Raposo Tavares raided 21 Jesuit villages in the upper Paraná Valley, ultimately capturing about 2,500 natives. A bandeira tactic was to set native tribes against each other in order to weaken them, and then to enslave both sides.

In 1636, Tavares led a bandeira, composed of 2,000 allied Indians, 900 mamelucos, and 69 white Paulistas, to find precious metals and stones and to capture Indians for slavery. This expedition alone was responsible for the destruction of most of the Jesuit missions of Spanish Guayrá and the enslavement of over 60,000 indigenous people. Between 1648 and 1652, Tavares also led one of the longest known expeditions from São Paulo to the mouth of the Amazon river, investigating many of its tributaries, including the Rio Negro, ultimately covering a distance of more than 10,000 kilometers. The expedition traveled to Andean Quito, part of the Spanish Viceroyalty of Peru, and remained there for a short time in 1651. Of the 1,200 men who left São Paulo, only 60 reached their final destination in Belém.

 Relations with Jesuits 

The Bandeirantes and the Jesuits did not agree on the treatment of the native people. The Jesuits wanted to convert the native population to Christianity while the Bandeirantes wanted to sell the native population into slavery. Jesuit leader father Antonio Ruiz de Montoya would attempt to lead 12,000 natives to safety into Argentina in an attempt to save them from Bandeirantes. With the death of Diego Alfaro by the hands of Bandeirantes a conflict was sure to come between the two groups and it all came to head when Jerónimo Pedroso de Barros and Manuel Pires attacked a Jesuit camp. The Jesuits led by father Pedro Romero had a force of around 4,200 against the Bandeirantes force of about 3,500. Romero would repel the assault and win the day. With the Treaty of Madrid (13 January 1750)  Spain and Portugal would agree to dismantle the Jesuit missions called the Misiones Orientales. The Jesuits would fight back against this order and would lead to the Guaraní War which saw the Spanish and Portuguese fight against the native Guarani population. Despite early failures due to guerrilla tactics the Spanish and Portuguese would attack and José Joaquín de Viana would defeat Guarani leader Sepé Tiaraju and would go on to destroy the Jesuit mission camps. The battle ended the war and with Portugal expelling the Jesuits from the country in 1759, it ended the relations between the Jesuits and the Bandeirantes.

 Fernão Dias Pais Lemme 

The most famous Bandeirante of them all was Fernão Dias. Dias was born in São Paulo in 1608 to a well-off family and spent much of his early life as a famer in Pinheiros before becoming an income inspector in 1626. However, it was 1638 when the one who would go on to be called "The Emerald Hunter" would get his first taste of expedition when he would join Antônio Raposo Tavares on his expedition to the present states of Paraná, Santa Catarina, and Rio Grande do Sul. Dias however left on his own expedition in 1644. In an expedition in 1661, in an attempt to find more natives to enslave, Dias explored south of the Anumarana mountain range into the Kingdom of  Guaianás. Dias would return in 1665 with 4000 slaves from three different tribes. It was during Dias's 1671 expedition that he would receive his nickname, as he would find emeralds in Sabarabuçu. In 1681, Dias died of disease while on an expedition in which he found Tourmaline.

Gold hunting
In addition to capturing natives as slaves, bandeiras also helped to extend the power of Portugal by expanding its control over the Brazilian interior. Along with the exploration and settlement of this territory the bandeiras also discovered mineral wealth for the Portuguese, which they had been previously unable to profit from.

In the 1660s, the Portuguese government offered rewards to those who discovered gold and silver deposits in inner Brazil. So the bandeirantes, driven by profit, ventured into the depths of Brazil not only to enslave natives, but also to find mines and receive government rewards. As the number of natives diminished, the bandeirantes began to focus more intensely on finding minerals.

These exploration by the Bandeirantes set in motion what would be called the Brazilian Gold Rush of the 1690s. The gold rush would be one of the largest in the world and would produce the largest gold mines in South America. With the discovery of gold by Bandeirantes in the mountains of Minas Gerais. This caused many people from the north of Brazil to go down south in hopes of finding gold.

Legacy

The bandeirantes were responsible for the discovery of mineral wealth, and, along with the missionaries, for the territorial enlargement of central and southern Brazil. This mineral wealth made Portugal wealthy during the 18th century. As a result of the bandeiras, the Captaincy of São Vicente became the basis of the Viceroyalty of Brazil, which would go on to encompass the current states of Santa Catarina, Paraná, São Paulo, Minas Gerais, Goiás, part of Tocantins, and both Northern and Southern Mato Grosso.  The bandeirantes were also responsible for unsteady relations between the Spanish Empire and the Portuguese Empire, as they essentially conducted an undeclared war on indigenous residents allied with Spain or the Jesuits.  With only a few outlying Spanish settlements surviving and the majority of Jesuit missions overrun, the de facto control by Portugal over most of what is now the Southeast, Southern, and Central West territory of Brazil was recognized by the Treaties of Madrid in 1750 and San Ildefonso in 1777.  Additionally, Portugal officially expelled the Jesuits in 1759, further reducing the ability of the Jesuits to fight back.

 20th and 21st Century 

Bandeirantes were an important part of the 1920s independence movement as they became a symbol of Brazilian pride.  A large part of this movement was to show the Bandeirantes as pure Brazilian and that they represented bravery and their sense of achievement. At this time many poems, paintings, movies, and books were made about Bandeirantes. Many statues were raised at this time, including the São Paulo's Monumento às Bandeiras.

In the 21st century, there have been calls to stop celebrating the Bandeirantes. Guards have been deployed in Brazil to protect the statues of Bandeirantes from vandalism. The statues have been criticized for celebrating the Bandeirantes for their practice of enslaving the native population. This new wave is trying to confront Brazil's controversial past and their practice of glorifying slave traders. Calls to take down statues were again intensified with Britain's removal of a statue of Edward Colston on June 7 of 2020. On July 24th of 2021 protesters, in response to Brazilians president Jair Bolsonaro's nationalist rhetoric, set fire to a statue of Borba Gato in São Paulo. The call for statue removal is not limited to Brazil—other countries in South America have also called for the removal of statues that depict slavery in a positive light.

Notable bandeirantes
Domingos Jorge Velho
Antônio Rodrigues de Arzão
Antônio Alvarenga
António Raposo Tavares
Bartolomeu Bueno da Silva (the Anhanguera)
Manuel de Borba Gato
Brás Leme
Fernão Dias Pais (“the Emerald hunter”)
Gabriel de Lara

Another list of well-known bandeirantes includes 
Antônio Dias de Oliveira
Domingos Rodrigues do Prado
 Salvador Furtado Fernandes de Mendonça
 Estêvão Ribeiro Baião Parente
 Brás Rodrigues de Arzão
 Manuel de Campos Bicudo
 Francisco Dias de Siqueira (the Apuçá'')
 Pascoal Moreira Cabral
 Antônio Pires de Campos
 Francisco Pedroso Xavier
 Lourenço Castanho Taques
 Tomé Portes del-Rei
 Antonio Garcia da Cunha
 Matias Cardoso de Almeida
 Salvador Faria de Albernaz
 José de Camargo Pimentel
 João Leite da Silva Ortiz
 João de Siqueira Afonso
 Jerônimo Pedroso de Barros and 
 Bartolomeu Bueno de Siqueira.

See also
São Paulo (state)#History
Slavery in Brazil
Brazilian Gold Rush, 1695–mid-1700s
El Dorado, the "Lost City of Gold"
European colonization of the Americas
Potosí#History and silver extraction, Spanish motherlode of silver in Bolivia
Degredados

Notes

Bibliography
 Leme, Luís Gonzaga da Silva, "Genealogia Paulistana" (1903-1905)
 Leme, Pedro Taques de Almeida Paes, "Nobiliarquia Paulistana Histórica e Genealógica", Ed. São Paulo University (1980, São Paulo).
 Taunay, Afonso de E., "Relatos Sertanistas", Ed. São Paulo University (1981, São Paulo) *  
 Taunay, Afonso de E., "História das Bandeiras Paulistas", Ed. Melhoramentos (São Paulo)
 Franco, Francisco de Assis Carvalho, "Dicionário de Bandeirantes e Sertanistas do Brasil", Ed. São Paulo University, São Paulo, Ed Itatiaia, Belo Horizonte (1989)
 Deus, Frei Gaspar da Madre de, "História da Capitania de São Vicente", Ed. São Paulo University (1975, São Paulo)
Crow, John A., “The Epic of Latin America,” (London, 1992)
Hemming, John, "Red Gold: The Conquest of the Brazilian Indians, 1500–1760 (London, 1978)

External links
 General History of the Paulista Bandeiras, by Afonso Taunay
 Memoirs to the history of the captaincy of São Vicente, autor Frei Gaspar da Madre de Deus
 Integral edition of the book 'Paulistana nobility – Genealogy of the main families from São Paulo, in Portuguese, by Pedro Taques de Almeida Paes Leme
Paulistana Genealogy, Silva Leme
History of the Captaincy of São Vicente, Pedro Taques de Almeida Paes Leme
Projeto Compartilhar, a database of documents related to the families of the settlers of São Paulo, then captaincy of São Vicente

Portuguese words and phrases
Colonial Brazil
Portuguese explorers of South America
Portuguese colonization of the Americas
Portuguese slave traders
History of São Paulo (state)
Slavery in Brazil
1740s neologisms